The Electro-Motive Diesel (EMD) Class 66 (or JT42CWR) are Co-Co diesel locomotives built by EMD for the European heavy freight market. Designed for use in Great Britain as the British Rail Class 66, a development of the Class 59, they have been adapted and certified for use in other European countries. Outside Europe, 40 locomotives have been sold to Egyptian Railways for passenger operation.

A number of locomotives built for Euro Cargo Rail in France with roof-mounted air conditioning are classed Class 77. In Germany ECR units operated for DB Schenker were numbered as class 247, re-classified as class 266 by the Eisenbahn-Bundesamt to match other Class 66 locomotives operating in Germany.

History

United Kingdom

The class was designed by General Motors-Electro Motive Division for use in the UK, and 250 were sold to English Welsh & Scottish, with orders from Direct Rail Services, Fastline, Freightliner and GB Railfreight.

Ireland

While not exactly a Class 66, a mixed-traffic version operates on the island of Ireland, being owned by Iarnród Éireann and NI Railways. The 32 were ordered after the economic boom with 2 extra ordered by NIR from their supplier EMD; the first one was delivered in 1994 after being flown from London, Ontario to Dublin Airport by an Antonov An-124 Ruslan, with the rest of the class arriving by ship in the following months.

Mainland Europe
With the locomotives proving successful in the UK, interest came from railway operators in continental Europe. General Motors locomotives in mainland Europe had historically been produced under license by local manufacturers. The high haulage capacity and reliability of the Class 59 (JT26-CW-SS) had led to its use by the German company Häfen und Güterverkehr Köln (HGK). The first mainland Europe order also came from HGK, for two locomotives, followed by TGOJ Trafik in Sweden. Subsequently, many European railway operators bought locomotives.

Class 77
With a high number of orders, EMD modified the locomotive for European ECR operations, including:
Powered by a 12-cylinder 710 engine that meets EU Stage IIIA emissions regulations, via latest EM2000 control system
DC traction motors, rated at 
ECR Train Protection System allowing for immediate certification for operation in France, Germany and Belgium, but meaning that they cannot operate in Great Britain
Additional driver facilities, including cab air conditioning; a microwave and fridge in one cab; additional noise cancelling insulation; a modified seat

Designated JT42CWRM-100 by EMD and registered in France as Class 77, over 100 locomotives have been purchased including 60 by DB Schenker subsidiary Euro Cargo Rail.

Class 66EU
In 2008 EMD announced plans to develop a new variant 'Class 66EU' designed for continental European operations, built within the UIC 505-1 loading gauge as opposed to the restrictive UK loading gauge. A range of European safety systems would be supported including ERTMS, and locomotives would be fitted with a dynamic brake and previous issues with driver comfort were to be addressed. The project was confirmed to be cancelled in 2011. A similar locomotive concept using EMD technology is the Vossloh Euro 4000 and has been delivered to operators in several countries including Norway, France, Spain, Portugal and Israel.

Technical
The locomotive uses standard EMD components - an EMD 710 prime mover, D43 traction motors, radial (self-steering) bogies of patented design, which reduce wheel surface and flange wear and are said to improve adhesion and reduce track load.

The class has undergone updates; other than the lower-geared class 66/6 produced for Freightliner, most of the updates have been in relation to conforming to specifications for exhaust particulate emissions.

Despite being popular with rail operators, especially due to its high reliability, the class has not been universally successful: one recurring problem has been driver comfort. In particular, noise levels (including noise from the cab horn), vibration, and excessive cab-temperatures in hot weather have brought serious complaints. The cab is not isolated from the main frame, causing engine noise to be the dominant background noise; notwithstanding the implications for safety (audibility of warning signals etc.), and the potential for hearing damage in the long term, the conditions drivers face led to threats of industrial action in the UK in 2007, and an agreement for increased pay for drivers using this type of locomotive (in Norway). By modifying using noise absorbing materials EMD succeeded in meeting TSI Noise Certification standards in 2008. Tests on retrofitted cooling systems and improved seating have been carried out on some UK locomotives.

ETCS Equipment
Between 2006 and 2010, 12 locomotives belonging to Mitsui Capital Rail Europe (MRCE), operating in the Netherlands and Germany, were equipped with ETCS, principally to allow them to work on the equipped Betuweroute, comprising the ETCS Level 1 "Havenspoorlijn" in the Rotterdam harbour area and the ETCS Level 2 "A15" route linking Rotterdam to the German border.. The MRCE locomotives were sold to Beacon Rail in 2015. Commencing in 2015, 15 locomotives owned by Ascendos Rail Leasing and 10 locomotives owned and operated by Crossrail Benelux were equipped with ETCS.

Idle reduction
As a fuel-saving and wear-reduction measure operator DB Schenker Rail UK is to fit ninety of its fleet with automatic engine stop start technology by the end of 2015. The modification is provided by ZTR Control Systems of London, Ontario and is expected to reduce engine running hours by about one-third.

Operators

Europe
Certification (homologation) is needed for each country of operation.
The locos were initially given a temporary certificate for use in France, and full certification came in 2009 (they had previously operated in France on some routes), Romanian certification came in 2007 The class is certified for operation in Germany, the Netherlands, Luxembourg, Belgium, Sweden, Norway, Poland and Denmark. As of 1 January 2009, certification for use in the Czech Republic and Slovakia was pending.

Africa
They are operated in Egypt by the Egyptian National Railways.
They are operated on the Trans-Gabon Railway.

List of operators

See also
Voith Maxima
GE PowerHaul
Vossloh Euro
IE 201 Class

Notes

References

Literature

External links

 EMD JT42CWRM Specifications Brochure
 Dutch railfan page on Class 66 (in English)

Series 66
Co-Co locomotives
Diesel-electric locomotives of Germany
Diesel-electric locomotives of Egypt
Railway locomotives introduced in 1998
Diesel-electric locomotives of Great Britain
CargoNet locomotives
Diesel-electric locomotives of Norway
Standard gauge locomotives of Great Britain
Class 66
Standard gauge locomotives of France
Standard gauge locomotives of Poland
Standard gauge locomotives of Belgium
Standard gauge locomotives of the Netherlands
Standard gauge locomotives of Luxembourg
Standard gauge locomotives of Germany
Standard gauge locomotives of Sweden
Standard gauge locomotives of Denmark
Standard gauge locomotives of Norway
Standard gauge locomotives of Gabon
Standard gauge locomotives of Egypt
Diesel-electric locomotives of France
Diesel-electric locomotives of Poland
Diesel-electric locomotives of Belgium
Diesel-electric locomotives of the Netherlands
Diesel-electric locomotives of Luxembourg
Diesel-electric locomotives of Sweden
Diesel-electric locomotives of Denmark
Diesel-electric locomotives of Gabon

fr:Classe 66
ja:クラス66ディーゼル機関車